Free Nationals is the debut album by American R&B band Free Nationals. It was released on December 13, 2019, through OBE and Empire Distribution.  The album features guest appearances from Mac Miller, Kali Uchis, Daniel Caesar, Anderson .Paak, T.I., JID, and MIKNNA among others. It was nominated for Best Progressive R&B Album at the 63rd Annual Grammy Awards.

Musical style 
Free Nationals has been described as classic R&B, funk and soul with a modern twist, nodding to legends like Stevie Wonder and Parliament-Funkadelic.

Recording and production 
The album was produced by the four Free Nationals band members. The songs were run through a tape recorder to add analogue distortion and warmth, adding to the retro feel of the album. It was mixed by Callum Connor and Andrew Wuepper at The Crying Panther Studio, Los Angeles and mastered by Dave Kutch at The Mastering Palace, New York City.

Release and promotion

Background 
Free Nationals announced the album in early 2018 and it was expected to be released before 2019 however the release was delayed until December 2019. The band stated in a tweet: “The real reason it was delayed was because of our rigorous touring schedule”, referring to touring with fellow musician Anderson .Paak. In the same tweet, the band confirmed that the release date would be December 13, 2019.

Singles 
A total of five singles were released for the album throughout 2018 and 2019. The first single, 'Beauty & Essex' was released on October 9, 2018. 'Time' featuring Mac Miller and Kali Uchis was released on June 12, 2019. It was the first posthumous release from Mac Miller and reached number 22 on the Official New Zealand Music Chart. 'On Sight' was released on September 20, 2019, Eternal Light on October 15, 2019, and Shibuya on November 8, 2019.

Music videos 
The music video for "Beauty & Essex", directed by Scott Lazer, was released on November 8, 2018.

The music video for "Time" was released on August 1, 2019. The colorful video was animated by BABEKÜHL, a Sydney-based creative studio.

Artwork 
The album's retro airbrush style artwork was created by Lexington based artist and musician Robert Beatty.

Critical reception 

Metacritic, which uses a weighted average, assigned a score of 74 out of 100 based on 7 critic's reviews, which indicates "generally favorable reviews". Q Magazine stated "Free Nationals say less about the band's identity than it does their taste, skill and curatorial clout--but that's still more than plenty". Mojo said "Free Nationals' blissed-out, woozy slow-jams make for a low-key triumph". NME also reviewed the album, stating "The Free Nationals’ supreme musicianship is unquestionable, but they more often than not seem to require an outside presence leading from the front to really bring it all home".

Accolades

Track listing

Personnel 

Adapted from the album's liner notes and online sources.
Free Nationals
 Jose Rios 
 Callum Connor 
 Kelsey Gonzales 
 Ron "T.Nava" Avant

Featured artists
 Mac Miller
 Anderson .Paak
 Kali Uchis 
 Daniel Caesar 
 MIKNNA
 Syd 
 Chronixx
 Benny Sings
 Unknown Mortal Orchestra
 T.I.
 Shafiq Husayn 
 Westside Gunn	
 Conway the Machine
 Joyce Wrice

Other musicians
 Maurice Brown - Trumpet (track 13) 
 Omar Dominick - Bass (track 7) 
 Jonah Levine - Trombone (tracks 4 & 5)
 Chris Lowery	 - Trumpet (track 8)
 Wes Lowery - Trombone (track 8)
 Emil Martinez - Trumpet (tracks 4 & 5)
 Danny McKinnon - Guitar (tracks 2 & 10)
 Vicky Farewell Nguyen - Keyboards (track 10)
 Erwin Pierce	- Saxophone (track 13)
 David Pimentel - Drum Programming, Keyboards (tracks 2, 10, 13)
Aaron Shaw - Flute (track 8)

Production
 Dave Kutch -	Mastering
 Andrew Wuepper - Mixing

Design
 Robert Beatty - Cover Art
 Anna-Marie Lopez - Photography

References 

2019 debut albums
Empire Distribution albums
Contemporary R&B albums by American artists